George Church (11 May 1890 – 18 March 1951) was a South African sports shooter. He competed in the team free rifle event at the 1924 Summer Olympics.

References

External links
 

1890 births
1951 deaths
South African male sport shooters
Olympic shooters of South Africa
Shooters at the 1924 Summer Olympics
Sportspeople from Kimberley, Northern Cape
Cape Colony people
20th-century South African people